Lake Onega (also known as Onego, ;) is a lake in northwestern Russia, on the territory of the Republic of Karelia, Leningrad Oblast and Vologda Oblast. It belongs to the basin of the Baltic Sea, and is the second-largest lake in Europe after Lake Ladoga, slightly smaller than Lebanon. The lake is fed by about 50 rivers and is drained by the Svir.

There are about 1,650 islands on the lake. They include Kizhi, which hosts a historical complex of 89 Orthodox churches and other wooden structures of the 15th–20th centuries. The complex includes a UNESCO World Heritage site, Kizhi Pogost. The eastern shores of the lake contain about 1,200 petroglyphs (rock engravings) dated to the 4th–2nd millennia BC, which have also been inscribed as a UNESCO World Heritage site. The major cities on the lake are Petrozavodsk, Kondopoga and Medvezhyegorsk.

Geological history
The lake is of glacial-tectonic origin and is a small remnant of a larger body of water which existed in this area during an Ice Age. In geologic terms, the lake is rather young, formed – like almost all lakes in northern Europe – through the carving activity of the inland ice sheets in the latter part of the last ice age, about 12,000 years ago: In the Paleozoic Era (400–300 million years ago) the entire territory of the modern basin of the lake was covered with a shelf sea lying near the ancient, near-equatoric Baltic continent. Sediments at that time – sandstone, sand, clay and limestone – form a  layer covering the Baltic Shield which consists of granite, gneiss and greenstone. The retreat of the Ice Age glaciers formed the Littorina Sea. Its level was first  higher than at present, but it gradually lowered, thereby decreasing the sea area and forming several lakes in the Baltic region.

Topography and hydrography
It is the second largest lake in Europe, and the 18th largest lake by area in the world. Its southern banks are mostly low and continuous, whereas northern banks are rocky and rugged. They contain numerous elongated bays resulting in the lake's outline appearing similar to a giant crayfish. In the northern part lies a large Zaonezhye Peninsula; south of it, is the Big Klimenetsky island. To the west of them lies the deep (deeper than ) Greater Onega area containing the Kondopozhskaya (depth up to ), Ilem-Gorskaya, Lizhemskoy and Unitskoy bays. To the southwest of Greater Onega lies Petrozavodskoye Onego containing the large Petrozavodsk and small Yalguba and Pinguba bays. To the east of Zaonezhye there is a bay, northern part of which is called Povenetsky Bay and the southern part is Zaonezhsky Bay. There, deep sections alternate with banks and islands which split the bay into several parts. All the shores there are rocky.

The bottom has a very uneven profile, it is covered with silt, and contains numerous trenches of various size and shape in the northern part. The trenches are separated by large shallow banks. Such bottom structure is favorable for fish, and the banks are used for commercial fishing.

The water level is stabilized by the Verhnesvirskaya hydropower plant and varies by only  over the year. It rises due to the spring flood which lasts  to 2 months. The highest water level is in June–August and the lowest is in March–April. Rivers bring  of water per year to the lake, that is up to 74% of the water balance; the rest is provided by precipitation. The lake freezes near the coast and bays in late November and December and around mid-January in its center. Thawing starts in April in the tributaries and reaches the lake in May. In the bays, the visibility may decrease to about a meter. The water is fresh, with a salinity of 35 mg/L. This is relatively low for a lake and is about  times lower than in the other large lake of the area, Lake Ladoga.

Basin and islands
The catchment area of  drains into the lake via 58 rivers and more than 110 tributaries, including the Shuya, Suna, Vodla, Vytegra and Andoma. The only outgoing Svir, which marks the southern boundary of Karelia, runs from the southwestern shore of Lake Onega to Lake Ladoga and continues as the Neva to the Gulf of Finland.

The White Sea–Baltic Canal runs through the lake from the White Sea to the Baltic Sea. The Volga–Baltic Waterway connects Onega Lake with the Volga, Caspian Sea and Black Sea. The Onega Canal, which follows the southern banks of the lake, was built in 1818–1820 and 1845–1852 between Vytegra in the east and Svir in the west. The canal was part of the Mariinsk Canal System, a forerunner of the Volga–Baltic Waterway, and aimed to create a quiet pass for boats avoiding the stormy waters of the lake. The canal is not used for active navigation at present.

It contains a few settlements, a school and an  hill. Other large islands are Big Lelikovsky and Suysari.

Flora and fauna
The lake banks are low and are flooded with raising water level. They are therefore swampy and are rich in reed, hosting ducks, geese and swans. The coastal region is covered with dense virgin forests. Major tree types are coniferous, but also common are lime (linden), elm and European alder. Common mammals include elks, brown bears, wolves, red foxes, European hares, blue hares, red squirrels, lynxes, pine martens, European badgers, as well as American muskrats and minks which were introduced to the area in the early 20th century. About 200 bird species from 15 families have been observed in the lake basin.

Lake Onega features a large variety of fish and water invertebrates, including relicts of the glacial period such as lamprey. There are about 47 fish species from 13 families; they include sturgeon, landlocked salmon, brown trout, European smelt, grayling, roaches, Crucian carp, whitefishes, char, pike, European cisco, common dace, silver bream, carp bream, sabre carp, spined loach, wels catfish, European eel, rudd, ide, gudgeon, pike-perch, European perch, ruffe and burbot.

Ecology
Whereas the area of the lake used to be clean, the pollution level is gradually increasing, especially in the northwestern and northern parts which contain the industrial facilities of Petrozavodsk, Kondopoga and Medvezhyegorsk. About 80% of the population and more than 90% of industry of the basin are concentrated in these areas.

Economy
The lake basin is a major source of granite, marble and black schist in Russia which have been exploited in the area since the early 18th century. Also advanced is metallurgy, especially in the Petrozavodsk area which produces about 25% of industrial products of Karelia. Water level of the lake is controlled by the Nizhnesvirskaya ("Lower Svir") and Verkhnesvirskaya ("Upper Svir") hydroelectric power plants. The former was built between 1927 and 1938 and has a peak power of 99 MW. The construction of Verkhnesvirskaya plant started in 1938, but was interrupted by World War II and could only be resumed in 1947. The plant was completed in 1952 and provided 160 MW of electric power.

The lake contains a well-developed navigation system which is part of the Volga–Baltic Waterway and White Sea – Baltic Canal, connecting the basins of Baltic, Caspian and the northern seas. These canals allow water transport of goods from the lake to the countries from Germany to Iran; most traffic goes to Finland, Sweden, Germany and Denmark. The Onega Canal running along the southern shore of the lake there is not used at present. Cargo on Lake Onega amounts to 10–12 million tonnes per year with about 10,300 ship voyages. Lake shores contain two ports (Petrozavodsk and Medvezhyegorsk), 5 wharves (Kondopoga, Povenets, Shala, Vytegra and Ascension) and 41 piers.

Fishery is an important activity on the lake. About 17 species are being fished commercially, mostly European cisco, smelt, whitefishes, roaches, burbot, pike-perch, perch, ruffe, carp bream, lake salmon, pike and somewhat less ide, graylings, common dace, common bleak and crucian carp.

Whereas there is no regular passenger service on the lake, there are several tourist trips per day along the routes of Petrozavodsk–Kizhi, Petrozavodsk–Velikaya Guba and Petrozavodsk–Shala. They are run by hydrofoil and motor ships and are used for passenger transport as well. In addition, passenger ships go on the route Petrozavodsk – Shala.

Sailing is a popular activity on the lake and there is a sailing club in Petrozavodsk.  Since 1972, every year at the end of July the lake has hosted the largest regatta in Russia ("") which is the Russian Open Championship in the Russian class of Cruisers Yachts "Open800". The regatta has international status.

History and places

Cities
The largest city on the lake is Petrozavodsk – the capital of Republic of Karelia (about 270,000 citizens) founded in 1703 by Peter I to exploit the natural ore deposits. Petrozavodsk area contains a large number of historical monuments, such as Architectural ensemble Round Square (end of 18th century) and gymnasium building  of 1790. The embankment of Lake Onega contains a series of sculptures, many of which were presented as gifts from the twin cities.

Kondopoga is known from 1495 and contains the Uspenskaya (Assumption) Church built in 1774. This  construction is one of the tallest wooden churches of the Russian North. There are two carillons in the city, with 23 and 18 bells, also there is an indoor ice sports arena accommodating 1,850 spectators and a Palace of Arts with an organ.

Medvezhyegorsk city was founded in 1916 and from 1931 became the construction base of the White Sea – Baltic Canal. Between 1703–1710 and 1766–1769 a factory was operating on the site of the city. During the World War II, for three years this area was occupied by the Finnish forces and was a place of busy military activities.

Kizhi island

The main attraction of the lake is the island of Kizhi in the northern part of the lake, which is a State Historical, Architectural and Ethnographic Preservation Area. There are 89 wooden architectural monuments of the 15th to 20th centuries on the island. The most remarkable of those is Kizhi Pogost of the early 18th century which consists of a summer church with 22 domes, a winter church with nine domes, and a belfry. The pogost was included in the list of UNESCO World Heritage sites in 1990. In the summer, there are daily boat connections to the island from Petrozavodsk.

Onega petroglyphs

Another attraction of the lake are the Onega petroglyphs (rock engravings). They are located on the eastern coast of the lake and date back to between the 4th and 2nd millennia BC. There are about 1,200 petroglyphs scattered over the  area including several capes, such as Besov Nos (see map above).

In 2021, the petroglyphs were inscribed on the UNESCO World Heritage List for its significant artistic qualities that testify the creativity of the Stone Age.

Others
Many other historical monuments are scattered around the lake. They include Svyat-Uspensky monastery on the cape of Murom, on the eastern shore of the lake. The monastery was founded in 1350, closed in 1918 and restored in 1991.

References

External links

 

LOnega
Onega
Onega
Onega